The First Intimate Contact is a 1998 novel by Taiwanese writer Tsai Jhi-heng (蔡智恆, with pen name 痞子蔡 and userID jht). It had also been adapted into a movie.

Background
The First Intimate Contact was first published by Tsai in the form of online installments on a bulletin board system. The complete story became popular in Taiwan, attracting a publisher and being released in print.

Plot summary
The protagonist (who shares the same name as the author) meets and falls in love with a girl, FlyNDance, on the Internet. They eventually meet up in real life and become a couple, going out by day and chatting online by night. After some time together, however, FlyNDance is diagnosed with systemic lupus erythematosus (erroneously translated as erysipelas in the English translation), which symbolically causes a butterfly-shaped rash to appear on her face. The disease proves to be fatal and the novel ends with the protagonist finding and reading a letter FlyNDance had written for him before she died.

Dolce Vita
Soon after the complete novel was released online, an anonymous Singaporean language localization was written in English and circulated around the Internet under the name Dolce Vita. This version is considerably shorter than the original and takes place in Singapore instead of Taiwan.

References

External links
The entire novel available freely online on the author's site
 
 

1998 graphic novels
Taiwanese novels
Novels first published in serial form